More FM may refer to:

 More FM in New Zealand
 XHMORE-FM, a radio station in Mexico branded as More FM
 WBEB, a radio station in Philadelphia, Pennsylvania formerly branded as More FM